I Am My Brother's Keeper is a 1970 album by Motown vocalists and siblings Jimmy Ruffin and David Ruffin,  credited as "The Ruffin Brothers". The album includes the singles "Stand by Me" and "When My Love Hand Comes Down".

The album was belatedly reissued on CD in 2010 by Hip-O Select, along with additional bonus tracks.

Track listing

Chart history

Personnel
Lead vocals by Jimmy and David Ruffin
Background vocals by The Originals and The Andantes
Instrumentation by The Funk Brothers
David Van DePitte, Henry Cosby, Paul Riser, Robert White, Tom Baird, Wade Marcus, Willie Shorter - arrangements

References

1970 albums
Motown albums
David Ruffin albums
Albums arranged by Wade Marcus
Albums arranged by Paul Riser
Albums produced by Henry Cosby
Albums produced by Frank Wilson (musician)